Winden may refer to:

Germany
Winden im Elztal, in the district of Emmendingen, Baden-Württemberg
Winden, Aichach-Friedberg, in the district of Aichach-Friedberg, Schwaben, Bayern
Winden, Germersheim, in the district of Germersheim, Rhineland-Palatinate
Winden, Rhein-Lahn, in the district Rhein-Lahn-Kreis, Rhineland-Palatinate

Elsewhere
Winden am See, in Burgenland, Austria

Fiction 

 Winden, a fictional town in the German Netflix series Dark

See also
 Wenden (disambiguation)